Tudway is a surname. Notable people with the surname include:

Clement Tudway (1734–1815), British lawyer and politician
Hervey Tudway (1888–1914), English cricketer
Robert Tudway (1808–1855), British politician
Thomas Tudway (died 1726), English musician and composer